Arnières-sur-Iton (literally Arnières on Iton) is a commune in the Eure department in Normandy in northern France.

Population

See also
Communes of the Eure department

References

External links

  Village Arnières sur Iton  website

Communes of Eure